A Time for Love is a studio album by Cuban performer Arturo Sandoval. It was released by Concord Records on May 11, 2010. The album was produced by Jorge Calandrelli and Gregg Field and features collaborations by Chris Botti, Kenny Barron and Monica Mancini.

Composition 
The album includes a collection of classical pieces, standards, and ballads written by several writers such as Gabriel Fauré, Johnny Mandel, Johnny Mercer, Ogden Nash, Kurt Weill, Bruno Brighetti, Bruno Martino, Maurice Ravel, George Gershwin, Ira Gershwin, DuBose Heyward, Marty Panzer, Ástor Piazzolla, Charlie Chaplin, Geoffrey Parsons, James Phillips, Sammy Cahn, Jimmy Van Heusen, Otto Harbach, Jerome Kern, Alan Bergman, Marilyn Bergman, Michel Legrand and Cole Porter. Sandoval originally wanted to record and release the album by himself, until pianist Shelly Berg brought him to Gregg Field, of Concord Records, who brought in Grammy Award-winning arranger Jorge Calandrelli. They co-produced while Calandrelli arranged eight of the nine string charts, Berg arranged the rest and brought in his trio to back up Sandoval. Sandoval mentioned that his two greatest inspirations for this album were trumpeter Bobby Hackett's playing with the Jackie Gleason Orchestra, and the album Clifford Brown with Strings.

Reception

The critical reception for the album has been extremely positive. Dan Oullette of Billboard magazine named the album "a gem" and the zenith of Sandoval's 20-plus-year recording career. He also praised the performer's expanded repertoire, especially for the selection of the songs "Oblivion", with the collaboration from Monica Mancini, and "Pavane Pour une Infante Défunte", with Chris Botti. While reviewing the album, Thom Jurek of Allmusic said: "It's tempting to call A Time for Love Sandoval's masterpiece, but that is based on the sharp contrast with virtually everything else in his catalog; only time will reveal whether or not it is." Jurek also pointed out the emotional depth of the performer, and also named "stellar" the collaborations with Kenny Barron and Shelly Berg. At the 11th Latin Grammy Awards, the album earned the accolade for Best Instrumental Album and won Jorge Calandrelli and Gregg Field the award for Producer of the Year. A Time for Love also received a nomination for Best Engineered Album, for Gregg Field and Don Murray (engineers), and Michael Bishop (mastering engineer).

Track listing

Personnel 

Kenny Barron – piano
Shelly Berg – arranger, piano, rhythm arrangements
Chuck Berghofer – bass
Charlie Bisharat, Darius Campo, Kevin Connolly, David Ewart, Tamara Hatwan, Tiffany Yi Hu, Razdan Kuyumijian, Songa Lee, Natalie Leggett, Phillip Levy, Liane Mautner, Robin Olson, Searmi Park – violin
Michael Bishop – mastering, mixing
Chris Botti – trumpet
John Burk – executive producer
Jorge Calandrelli – arranger, conductor, producer, string arrangements
Larissa Collins – art direction
Waldy Dominguez, Gerrit Kinkel, Don Murray – engineer
Bruce Dukov – concert master
Christine Ermacoff, Keith Greene, Darren McCann – cello
Alma Fernandez, Harry Shirinian – viola
Gregg Field – drums, engineer, mixing, percussion, pro-tools, producer
Vanessa Freebairn-Smith, Trevor Handy, Dennis Karmazin – cello
Steve Genewick – assistant engineer, mixing
Milton Gutierrez – assistant engineer
Mary Hogan – A&R
Manny Iriarte – photography
Mark Joggerst – arranger
Ralf Kemper – producer
Monica Mancini – vocals
Jorge Pinos – management
Seth Presant – mixing
Phil Ramone – mixing
David Ritz – liner notes
Albert J. Roman – package design
Arturo Sandoval – arranger, flugelhorn, trumpet, vocals

Chart performance

References

2010 albums
Arturo Sandoval albums
Concord Records albums
Latin Grammy Award for Best Instrumental Album